The S postcode area, also known as the Sheffield postcode area, is a group of postcode districts in England, which are subdivisions of eight post towns. These cover most of South Yorkshire (including Sheffield, Barnsley, Rotherham and Mexborough), parts of north Derbyshire (including Chesterfield, Dronfield and the Hope Valley) and north-west Nottinghamshire (including Worksop), plus a small part of West Yorkshire. The S postcode area is one of six with a population above 1 million.

History
For 1857–1868 an S sector of the London postal district existed.

Similarly, there were also S-prefixed postal districts in the compass-based system used in Glasgow: Glasgow S1, S2, S3 and S4, which later became G41 to G44.

Three postcode districts were split and separated into ten new postcode districts. These were:
S20, formed out of S19
S21, S25 and S26, formed out of S31
S32 to S36, formed out of S30.

The S64 district covering the Mexborough post town was originally earmarked for use as DN13, which has never been used.

Coverage
The approximate coverage of the postcode districts:

|-
! S1
| SHEFFIELD
|Sheffield City Centre
| Sheffield
|-
! S2
| SHEFFIELD
|Arbourthorne, Heeley, Highfield, Manor, Norfolk Park, Wybourn, Park Hill, Castlebeck, Deep Pit, Cutler's View, Lowfield, Heeley Green, Newfield Green, Parkway
| Sheffield
|-
! S3
| SHEFFIELD
|Sheffield City Centre, Broomhall, Burngreave, Neepsend, Netherthorpe, Kelham Island, West Bar, Parkwood Springs, Wicker
| Sheffield
|-
! S4
| SHEFFIELD
|Grimesthorpe, Pitsmoor, Crab Tree, Brightside
| Sheffield
|-
! S5
| SHEFFIELD
|Firth Park, Fir Vale, Longley, Shirecliffe, Shiregreen, Southey Green, Parson Cross, Wincobank, Norwood, Lane Top, Pismire Hill
| Sheffield
|-
! S6
| SHEFFIELD
|Bradfield, Dungworth, Hillsborough, Holdworth, Hollow Meadows, Loxley, Malin Bridge, Middlewood, Stannington, Storrs, Upperthorpe, Walkley, Wadsley Bridge, Wisewood, Wadsley, Fox Hill

| Sheffield
|-
! S7
| SHEFFIELD
|Abbeydale, Carter Knowle, Nether Edge, Millhouses, Beauchief
| Sheffield
|-
! S8
| SHEFFIELD
|Batemoor, Beauchief, Greenhill, Jordanthorpe, Lowedges, Meersbrook, Norton, Norton Lees, Woodseats, Meadowhead
| Sheffield
|-
! S9
| SHEFFIELD
|Attercliffe, Brightside, Darnall, Meadowhall, Wincobank, Tinsley, Newhall, Greenland, Handsworth Hill, Lower Don Valley, Lydden
| Sheffield
|-
! S10
| SHEFFIELD
|Broomhill, Broomhall, Crookes, Crookesmoor, Crosspool, Fulwood, Ranmoor, Endcliffe, Hallam Head, Steel Bank
| Sheffield
|-
! S11
| SHEFFIELD
|Ecclesall, Endcliffe Park, Ecclesall Road, Greystones, Hunter's Bar, Millhouses, Sharrow Vale, Nether Edge, Whirlow, Brincliffe, Bents Green, Ringinglow, Whirlow, Fox House, ParkHead, Sharrow
| Sheffield
|-
! S12
| SHEFFIELD
|Birley, Gleadless, Gleadless Townend, Frecheville, Hackenthorpe, Intake, Ridgeway, Hollinsend, Highlane
| North East Derbyshire, Sheffield
|-
! S13
| SHEFFIELD
| Fence, Handsworth, Orgreave, Richmond, Woodhouse, Woodhouse Mill, Normanton Spring, Woodthorpe
| Rotherham, Sheffield
|-
! S14
| SHEFFIELD
| Gleadless Valley, Herdings
| Sheffield
|-
! S17
| SHEFFIELD
| Dore, Totley, Bradway, Totley Brook, Totley Rise
| Sheffield
|-
! S18
| DRONFIELD
| Coal Aston, Dronfield, Dronfield Woodhouse, Holmesfield, Unstone
| North East Derbyshire
|-
! S19
| colspan="3" | Recoded to S20
|-
! S20
| SHEFFIELD
| Beighton, Crystal Peaks, Halfway, Mosborough, Owlthorpe, Sothall, Waterthorpe, Westfield, Plumbley, Holbrook
| Sheffield
|-
! S21
| SHEFFIELD
| Eckington, Killamarsh, Renishaw, Spinkhill, Marsh Lane, Troway, Middle Handley, West Handley
| North East Derbyshire
|-
! S25
| SHEFFIELD
| Anston, Brookhouse, Dinnington, Laughton en le Morthen, Slade Hooton
| Rotherham
|-
! S26
| SHEFFIELD
| Aston, Aughton, Harthill, Kiveton Park, Swallownest, Todwick, Wales, Waleswood, Woodall, Ulley
| Rotherham
|-
! S30
| colspan="3" | Recoded to S32, S33, S35, S36
|-
! S31
| colspan="3" | Recoded to S21, S25, S26
|-
! S32
| HOPE VALLEY
| Calver, Eyam, Grindleford, Hathersage, Stoney Middleton, Abney, Leam, Bretton, Foolow, Curbar, Upper Padley, North Padley,
| Derbyshire Dales
|-
! S33
| HOPE VALLEY
| Bamford, Bradwell, Castleton, Edale, Hope, Yorkshire Bridge, Barber Booth, Aston , Thornhill
| High Peak
|-
! S35
| SHEFFIELD
| Chapeltown, Crane Moor, Ecclesfield, Green Moor, Grenoside, Hermit Hill, High Green, Oughtibridge, Thurgoland, Wharncliffe Side, Wortley, Worrall
| Sheffield
|-
! S36
| SHEFFIELD
| Penistone, Thurlstone, Millhouse Green, Oxspring, Stocksbridge, Deepcar, Bolsterstone, Catshaw, Snowden hill, Langsett, Crow Edge, Carlecotes, Dunford Bridge, Midhopestones, Wigtwizzle, Ingbirchworth, Hoylandswaine, Upper Midhope
| Barnsley, Sheffield
|-
! S40
| CHESTERFIELD
| Central and West Chesterfield, Brampton, Birdholme, Boythorpe
| Chesterfield
|-
! S41
| CHESTERFIELD
| Hasland, North Chesterfield, Old Whittington, Sheepbridge, Whittington Moor, Tapton, Newbold, Hasland Green, Spital, Winsick, Hasland, Corbriggs
| Chesterfield, North East Derbyshire
|-
! S42
| CHESTERFIELD
| Holymoorside, Grassmoor, North Wingfield, Tupton, Wingerworth, Mastin Moor, Overgreen, Cutthorpe, Eastmoor, Wadshelf, Walton, Grassmoor, Holmewood, North Wingfield, Temple Normanton, Alton
| Chesterfield, North East Derbyshire
|-
! S43
| CHESTERFIELD
| Brimington, Barlborough, Clowne, Inkersall Green, Staveley, Barrow Hill, Hollingwood, Poolsbrook, Staveley, Mastin Moor
| Bolsover, Chesterfield
|-
! S44
| CHESTERFIELD
| Bolsover, Calow, Sutton cum Duckmanton, Scarcliffe, Shuttlewood, Stanfree, Oxcroft, Arkwright Town, Sutton Scarsdale, Heath, Doe Lea, Stansby, Rowthorne, Ault Hucknall
| Bolsover, North East Derbyshire
|-
! S45
| CHESTERFIELD
| Ashover, Clay Cross, Pilsley, Uppertown, Kelstedge, Farhill, Milltown, Littlemoor, Lower Pilsley, Hardstoft, Astwith, Hardstoft, Slack
| North East Derbyshire
|-
! style="background:#FFFFFF;"|S49
| style="background:#FFFFFF;"|CHESTERFIELD
| style="background:#FFFFFF;"|Bulk users
| style="background:#FFFFFF;"|non-geographic
|-
! S60
| ROTHERHAM
| Brinsworth, Catcliffe, Canklow, Clifton Central Rotherham, Masbrough, Moorgate, Treeton, Waverley, Whiston
| Rotherham
|-
! S61
| ROTHERHAM
|Greasbrough, Kimberworth, Rockingham, Thorpe Hesley, Munsborough, Scholes, Ferham
| Rotherham
|-
! S62
| ROTHERHAM
| Rawmarsh, Wentworth, Parkgate, Abdy, Nether Haugh
| Rotherham
|-
! S63
| ROTHERHAM
| Bolton-on-Dearne, Goldthorpe, Thurnscoe, Brampton Bierlow, Wath-on-Dearne, West Melton
| Barnsley, Rotherham
|-
! S64
| MEXBOROUGH
| Mexborough, Swinton, Kilnhurst, Adwick Upon Dearne
| Doncaster, Rotherham
|-
! S65
| ROTHERHAM
| Herringthorpe, Hooton Roberts, Ravenfield, Thrybergh, East Dene, East Wood, Dalton
| 
|-
! S66
| ROTHERHAM
| Bramley Hellaby, Brampton-en-le-Morthen, Maltby, Stone, Thurcroft, Wickersley, Braithwell, Morthen, Stainton, Micklebring
| Rotherham
|-
! S70
| BARNSLEY
| Central Barnsley, Birdwell, Stairfoot, Worsborough, Kendray
| Barnsley
|-
! S71
| BARNSLEY
| Ardsley, Athersley, Monk Bretton, Lundwood, Royston
| Barnsley
|-
! S72
| BARNSLEY
| Brierley, Cudworth, Grimethorpe, Shafton, South Hiendley
| Barnsley, Wakefield
|-
! S73
| BARNSLEY
|Darfield, Wombwell, Hemingfield
| Barnsley, Rotherham
|-
! S74
| BARNSLEY
| Elsecar, Hoyland, Jump, Blacker Hill
| Barnsley
|-
! S75
| BARNSLEY
| Barugh Green, Cawthorne, Darton, Dodworth, Gawber, Mapplewell, Pogmoor, Staincross, Wilthorpe, Tankersley, Kexborough
| Barnsley
|-
! S80
| WORKSOP
| Worksop (south), Creswell, Rhodesia, Thorpe Salvin, Whitwell 
| Bassetlaw, Bolsover, Rotherham
|-
! S81
| WORKSOP
| Worksop (north), Blyth, Carlton-in-Lindrick, Langold, Shireoaks, Woodsetts
| Bassetlaw, Rotherham
|-
! style="background:#FFFFFF;"|S94
| style="background:#FFFFFF;"|SHEFFIELD
| style="background:#FFFFFF;"|Census 2021 (a main national office)
| style="background:#FFFFFF;"|non-geographic
|-
! style="background:#FFFFFF;"|S95
| style="background:#FFFFFF;"|SHEFFIELD
| style="background:#FFFFFF;"|Bulk users
| style="background:#FFFFFF;"|non-geographic
|-
! style="background:#FFFFFF;"|S96
| style="background:#FFFFFF;"|SHEFFIELD
| style="background:#FFFFFF;"|Bulk users
| style="background:#FFFFFF;"|non-geographic
|-
! style="background:#FFFFFF;"|S97
| style="background:#FFFFFF;"|ROTHERHAM, SHEFFIELD
| style="background:#FFFFFF;"|Bulk users
| style="background:#FFFFFF;"|non-geographic
|-
! style="background:#FFFFFF;"|S98
| style="background:#FFFFFF;"|SHEFFIELD
| style="background:#FFFFFF;"|Bulk users
| style="background:#FFFFFF;"|non-geographic
|-
! style="background:#FFFFFF;"|S99
| style="background:#FFFFFF;"|SHEFFIELD
| style="background:#FFFFFF;"|Jobcentre Plus
| style="background:#FFFFFF;"|non-geographic
|}

Map

See also
Postcode Address File
List of postcode areas in the United Kingdom

References

External links
Royal Mail's Postcode Address File
A quick introduction to Royal Mail's Postcode Address File (PAF)

Sheffield
Postcode areas covering Yorkshire and the Humber
Postcode areas covering the East Midlands